Bill Bowes (born October 17, 1943) is an American former college football player and coach. He served as the head football coach at the University of New Hampshire for 27 seasons, from 1972 to 1998, compiling a record of 175–106–5. Bowes is the longest-tenured and all-time winningest head coach for the New Hampshire Wildcats football team. His teams won four Yankee Conference championships and two divisional championships. Bowes played college football at Pennsylvania State University, lettering for the Nittany Lions from 1962 to 1964.

Head coaching record

The 1975 semifinal game was the Grantland Rice Bowl.

References

External links
 

1943 births
Living people
Boston College Eagles football coaches
College Football Hall of Fame inductees
New Hampshire Wildcats football coaches
Penn State Nittany Lions football coaches
Penn State Nittany Lions football players
Coaches of American football from Pennsylvania
Players of American football from Pennsylvania